A by-election was held for the British House of Commons constituency of Vale of Glamorgan on 4 May 1989 following the death of Conservative MP Sir Raymond Gower.

Eleven candidates stood, which remains the most in any Welsh by-election.

The result was a Labour gain, the party's first by-election gain of this parliamentary term, which came at a time when it was starting to match and even overtake the Conservative government in the opinion polls, just after the controversial poll tax was announced.

Neil Kinnock believed the result, which was reported as 'a massive victory' for Labour, showed a change in the Labour Party's fortunes, and stated "the tide has turned". The swing of 12.35 was significant as if repeated at the next general election would have resulted in Labour winning power. The result was reported by The Glasgow Herald as being a "humiliation" for both the Social and Liberal Democrats and SDP, the two centre parties which had emerged from the former SDP–Liberal Alliance. In the wake of the result the Social and Liberal Democrats' leader Paddy Ashdown called for SDP members to defect to his party, but this call was not supported by SDP leader David Owen, who instead indicated his party might be prepared to enter into a future coalition government with Labour.

Ultimately the seat was narrowly won back by the Conservatives at the 1992 general election.

References

See also
List of United Kingdom by-elections
Vale of Glamorgan (UK Parliament constituency)

By-elections to the Parliament of the United Kingdom in Welsh constituencies
May 1989 events in the United Kingdom
1989 elections in the United Kingdom
1989 in Wales
1980s elections in Wales
Politics of the Vale of Glamorgan